Squam Lakes Natural Science Center (SLNSC) is an environmental education center and zoo founded in 1966 and opened to the public on July 1, 1969. The science center is located in Holderness, New Hampshire, United States. The mission of the science center is to advance understanding of ecology by exploring New Hampshire's natural world.

The science center uses live animal exhibits, natural science education programs, and lake cruises to educate visitors about the natural world. Using the outdoors as a classroom and native New Hampshire animals as teaching ambassadors, the science center teaches the ecological concepts of adaptations, populations, interrelationships, and habitats.

History
The center was opened to the public on July 1, 1969.

In September 2006, the center was first accredited by the Association of Zoos and Aquariums (AZA). It is the only AZA-accredited institution in northern New England. The science center was accredited for a second five-year term in September 2011, and again in September 2016.

Animals

American black bear
White-tailed deer
Coyote
Mountain lion
Bobcat
North American river otter
Red fox
Bald eagle
American mink
Barred owl
Red-tailed hawk

See also
Holderness Inn, owned by the center and location of Kirkwood Gardens.
May Rogers Webster (1873-1938), conservationist based in Holderness

Notes

External links 

Nature centers in New Hampshire
Education in Grafton County, New Hampshire
Tourist attractions in Grafton County, New Hampshire
Buildings and structures in Grafton County, New Hampshire
Zoos in New Hampshire
Holderness, New Hampshire
Squam Lake